Mananchaya Sawangkaew (born 10 July 2002) is a tennis player from Thailand.

Career
She has a career-high singles ranking of 428 by the Women's Tennis Association (WTA). Sawangkaew has won two singles titles and one doubles title on the ITF Women's Circuit.

On the ITF Junior Circuit, she achieved a career-high combined ranking of 14 on 28 January 2019. She reached the quarterfinals of the girls' singles draw at the 2019 Australian Open.

Sawangkaew made her debut for Thailand Fed Cup team in 2019.

ITF Circuit finals

Singles: 5 (2 titles, 3 runner-ups)

Doubles: 4 (1 title, 3 runner–ups)

References

External links
 
 
 

2002 births
Living people
Mananchaya Sawangkaew
Tennis players at the 2018 Asian Games
Mananchaya Sawangkaew
Mananchaya Sawangkaew
Oklahoma State Cowgirls tennis players